New Berlinville is a census-designated place (CDP) in Colebrookdale Township, Berks County, Pennsylvania, United States.  It is located along Pennsylvania Route 100,  approximately one mile northeast of the borough of Boyertown.  As of the 2010 census, the population was 1,368 residents.

Demographics

References

External links

Census-designated places in Berks County, Pennsylvania
Census-designated places in Pennsylvania